Amery may refer to:

People
 Bill Amery, Australian rules footballer 
 Charlie Amery (1910–1979), British footballer
 Jean Améry (1912–1978), Austrian author
 John Amery (1912–1945), British fascist, executed for treason
 Julian Amery, Baron Amery of Lustleigh, British Conservative politician
 Leo Amery (1873–1955), British Conservative politician, Secretary of State for India, father of John and Julian
 Les Amery, former Australian rules footballer
 Mickey Amery, Canadian politician
 Moe Amery, former member of the Legislative Assembly of Alberta
 Richard Sanderson Amery, Australian former politician
 Shenda Amery, painter and sculptor
 William Bankes Amery, British painter and sculptor

Places
 Amery, Manitoba
 Amery railway station, in Amery, Manitoba, Canada
 Amery, Western Australia, rail siding
 Amery, Wisconsin, city in Polk County
 Amery Ice Shelf, Antarctica
 Amery Peaks, Antarctica